André Liabel was a French actor, film director and screenwriter.

André Liabel began his career as comedian by working full-time as an actor for the cinematographic compagny Laboratoires Éclair which had just opened its new studios at Épinay-sur-Seine in 1908.

He performed in more than sixty films until 1933. He also was assistant director.

Selected filmography 
Director
1913 : Jack, after the novel by Alphonse Daudet
1913 : La Petite chocolatière
1914 : Mademoiselle Josette, ma femme, script by Paul Gavault 
1915 : Le Calvaire, (short film)
1919 : Le Sang des immortelles 
1920 : Le Secret d'Alta Rocca, script by Valentin Mandelstamm
1922 : Des fleurs sur la mer, script by Henri-André Legrand
1924 : La Closerie des Genêts, after the novel by Frédéric Soulié
1928 : Dans l'ombre du harem, codirected with Léon Mathot
1929 : L'Appassionata, codirected with Léon Mathot after the play by Pierre Frondaie
1930 : Instinct, codirected avec Léon Mathot after the work by Henry Kistemaeckers

Assistant director
1924 : Paris by René Hervil
1926 : La Femme nue by Léonce Perret after the play by Henry Bataille
1928 : Morgane la sirène by Léonce Perret after the work of Charles Le Goffic

Screenwriter
1928 : Dans l'ombre du harem, codirected with Léon Mathot

Actor
 1912 : Au pays des ténèbres, short film by Victorin Jasset
 1923 : Koenigsmark
 1926                  : The Nude Woman
 1930 : La Femme et le Rossignol by André Hugon : captain Gervais
 1933 : The Two Orphans

External links 
   
Filmographie sélective d'André Liabel sur Dvdtoile

French male film actors
French male silent film actors
20th-century French male actors
French film directors
French male screenwriters
French screenwriters